Oceanwide Expeditions is a Dutch company specializing in expedition-style voyages to Antarctica and the Arctic. Deploying its own fleet of ice-strengthened vessels, Oceanwide emphasizes small-scale, flexible tours that provide passengers close contact with polar wildlife, landscapes, and historical sites. Tours usually take place in regions only accessible by sea, with little to no infrastructure. The locations visited are first reached by ship, after which expedition guides take small groups of passengers to landing sites by way of Zodiac Milpro RIBs (rigid inflatable boats), enabling safe cruising and maximum shore time.

History 
Starting in 1983, the Dutch “Plancius Foundation” was the first operator to organize yearly polar expedition cruises to the Arctic archipelago of Svalbard. Oceanwide Expeditions continued with the activities of the Plancius Foundation in 1993.

The origin of the Plancius Foundation started with the Arctic Centre at the University of Groningen, which launched a research program investigating 17th-century Dutch whaling around Spitsbergen, the largest island of the Svalbard chain. With Arctic archaeology professor Louwrens Hacquebord leading the initiative, the ship Pollox was purchased in 1979 and renamed Plancius to accommodate research around the Dutch settlement of Smeerenburg.

Along with the scientists on board were tourists who had paid for their Arctic journey, and their contributions formed part of the later financial support for the Svalbard expeditions. Eventually, however, funding troubles overtook the Plancius Foundation and the ship was sold.

Awards and recognitions 

 Five-time winner of World's Leading Polar Expedition Operator Award
 Geo Saison's Best Activity Provider Award at the 2013 ITB Berlin Goldene Palme Awards 
 Outside Magazine's first Active Travel Award winner in 2012
 Two-time winner of Puffin Award by AECO

Partnerships 
Oceanwide Expeditions works closely with organizations that support the preservation of natural habitats and sustainable environmental conditions. In the Arctic, these entities include the Association of Arctic Expedition Cruise Operators (AECO) and Clean Up Svalbard. In Antarctica, the International Association of Antarctic Tour Operators (IAATO) and BirdLife International are two organizations with whom Oceanwide works.

Fleet 
Oceanwide Expeditions currently operates five vessels of various nautical classes: sailing vessel , former Royal Dutch Navy oceanographic research vessel , former Russian Academy of Science vessel , and Polar Class 6 vessels m/v Hondius and m/v Janssonius. All vessels are equipped with Zodiac Milpro RIBs for ship-to-shore landings, while Ortelius is also outfitted with a helipad for helicopter flights in the Weddell and Ross seas.

Destinations

Arctic region 
 Bear Island
 Greenland
 Spitsbergen
 Jan Mayen
 Fair Isle
 North Norway

Antarctic region 
 Bouvet Island
 Cape Verde
 South Orkney Islands
 South Sandwich Islands
 Antarctic Peninsula
 South Shetland Islands
 Ross Sea
 Ushuaia
 Weddell Sea
 Falkland Islands
 South Georgia
 Ascension Island
 St. Helena
 Tristan da Cunha

The ideal time of year to visit the Arctic is around the Northern Hemisphere summer, from April through September. The Southern Hemisphere summer, from October through March, is the best time to visit Antarctica.

See also 
 Professor Molchanov 
 MV Antarctic Dream

References

External links 
 

Expedition cruising
Travel and holiday companies of the Netherlands
Companies based in Zeeland
Vlissingen